The 2000 Emerging Nations World Championship was the second edition of the tournament and was held alongside the 2000 Rugby League World Cup. The tournament was won by the British Amateur Rugby League Association (BARLA).

Venues
The games were played at various venues in England. The Final was played at Tetley's Stadium in Dewsbury.

Group stage

Group A

Group B

Knockout stage

See also
 1995 Rugby League Emerging Nations Tournament

References 

Rugby League Emerging Nations Tournament
Emerging Nations Tournament
International rugby league competitions hosted by the United Kingdom